Sir Derek Harold Spencer, KC (born 31 March 1936) is a British Conservative Party politician.

Education and career
Born in Clitheroe, Lancashire, he was educated at Clitheroe Royal Grammar School and Keble College, Oxford. He served as a lieutenant in the King's Own Regiment from 1954 to 1956. He became a barrister in 1961 and 'took silk' as a QC in 1980.

He is a Master of the Bench, Gray's Inn.

Political career
Spencer was elected councillor for the Highgate ward on Camden London Borough council in 1978 and was re-elected in 1982, this time for the Swiss Cottage ward. Spencer resigned from Camden council after he was elected as the Member of Parliament (MP) for the Leicester South constituency in the Conservative landslide of 1983, by just 7 votes — the smallest margin in the country. He lost the seat back to Labour in 1987.

He was elected for the marginal Brighton Pavilion seat in 1992, when he was knighted and appointed Solicitor-General.

As Solicitor General, he represented the government in several significant cases including Wingrove v UK (1997) about the application of blasphemy law under the Human Rights Act 1998.

In 1997, however, he was defeated by Labour's David Lepper by 13,181 votes on a 13.5% swing.

Memberships
 Ex officio Bar Council, 1992–1997
 Criminal Bar Association
 Northern Ireland Bar
 South Eastern Circuit

Family
Spencer has three sons (David, Andrew and Frederick) and one daughter (Caroline). His second wife, Caroline, died on 10 January 2003 of a heart attack.

References

External links 
 

1936 births
British King's Counsel
Conservative Party (UK) MPs for English constituencies
UK MPs 1983–1987
UK MPs 1992–1997
Solicitors General for England and Wales
Living people
Members of Gray's Inn
21st-century King's Counsel
Politicians from Brighton and Hove
Conservative Party (UK) councillors
Councillors in the London Borough of Camden